In mathematics, the Lucas sequences  and  are certain constant-recursive integer sequences that satisfy the recurrence relation

 

Any sequence satisfying this recurrence relation can be represented as a linear combination of the Lucas sequences  and 

Famous examples of Lucas sequences include the Fibonacci numbers, Mersenne numbers, Pell numbers, Lucas numbers, Jacobsthal numbers, and a superset of Fermat numbers (see below). Lucas sequences are named after the French mathematician Édouard Lucas.

Recurrence relations 

and

The above relations can be stated in matrix form as follows:

Examples 

Explicit expressions 

It has the discriminant  and the roots:

Thus:

Note that the sequence  and the sequence  also satisfy the recurrence relation. However these might not be integer sequences.

Distinct roots 
When , a and b are distinct and one quickly verifies that

It follows that the terms of Lucas sequences can be expressed in terms of a and b as follows

Repeated root 

The case  occurs exactly when  for some integer S so that . In this case one easily finds that

Properties

Generating functions 

The ordinary generating functions are

Pell equations 

When , the Lucas sequences  and  satisfy certain Pell equations:

Relations between sequences with different parameters 

 

For any number c, we also have

Other relations 

The terms of Lucas sequences satisfy relations that are generalizations of those between Fibonacci numbers  and Lucas numbers . For example:

Divisibility properties 

is a divisibility sequence. This implies, in particular, that  can be prime only when n is prime.
Moreover, if , then  is a strong divisibility sequence.

Other divisibility properties are as follows:
 If n / m is odd, then  divides .
 Let N be an integer relatively prime to 2Q.  If the smallest positive integer r for which N divides  exists, then the set of n for which N divides  is exactly the set of multiples of r.
 If P and Q are even, then  are always even except .
 If P and Q are odd, then  are even if and only if n is a multiple of 3.
 If p is an odd prime, then  (see Legendre symbol).
 If p is an odd prime and divides P and Q, then p divides  for every .
 If p is an odd prime and divides P but not Q, then p divides  if and only if n is even.
 If p is an odd prime and divides not PQ but D, then p divides  if and only if p divides n.
 If p is an odd prime and does not divide PQD, then p divides , where .

The last fact generalizes Fermat's little theorem.  These facts are used in the Lucas–Lehmer primality test.
The converse of the last fact does not hold, as the converse of Fermat's little theorem does not hold.  There exists a composite n relatively prime to D and dividing , where .  Such a composite is called a  Lucas pseudoprime.

A prime factor of a term in a Lucas sequence that does not divide any earlier term in the sequence is called primitive.
Carmichael's theorem states that all but finitely many of the terms in a Lucas sequence have a primitive prime factor.  Indeed, Carmichael (1913) showed that if D is positive and n is not 1, 2 or 6, then  has a primitive prime factor.  In the case D is negative, a deep result of Bilu, Hanrot, Voutier and Mignotte shows that if n > 30, then  has a primitive prime factor and determines all cases  has no primitive prime factor.

Specific names 

The Lucas sequences for some values of P and Q have specific names:

 : Fibonacci numbers
 : Lucas numbers
 : Pell numbers
 : Pell–Lucas numbers (companion Pell numbers)
 : Jacobsthal numbers
 : Jacobsthal–Lucas numbers
 : Mersenne numbers 2n − 1
 : Numbers of the form 2n + 1, which include the Fermat numbers
 : The square roots of the square triangular numbers.
 : Fibonacci polynomials
 : Lucas polynomials
 : Chebyshev polynomials of second kind
 : Chebyshev polynomials of first kind multiplied by 2
 : Repunits in base x
 : xn + 1

Some Lucas sequences have entries in the On-Line Encyclopedia of Integer Sequences:

{|class="wikitable" style="background: #fff"
|-
!!!!!!! 
|- 
| −1 || 3 || 
|-
| 1 || −1 ||  || 
|-
| 1 || 1 ||  || 
|-
| 1 || 2 ||  || 
|-
| 2 || −1 ||  || 
|-
| 2 || 1 || 
|-
| 2 || 2 ||  || 
|-
| 2 || 3 || 
|-
| 2 || 4 || 
|-
| 2 || 5 || 
|-
| 3 || −5 ||  || 
|-
| 3 || −4 ||  || 
|-
| 3 || −3 ||  || 
|-
| 3 || −2 ||  || 
|-
| 3 || −1 ||  || 
|-
| 3 || 1 ||  || 
|-
| 3 || 2 ||  || 
|-
| 3 || 5 || 
|-
| 4 || −3 ||  || 
|-
| 4 || −2 || 
|-
| 4 || −1 ||  || 
|-
| 4 || 1 ||  || 
|-
| 4 || 2 ||   || 
|-
| 4 || 3 ||  || 
|-
| 4 || 4 || 
|-
| 5 || −3 || 
|-
| 5 || −2 || 
|-
| 5 || −1 ||  || 
|-
| 5 || 1 ||  || 
|-
| 5 || 4 || || 
|-
| 6 || 1 || || 
|}

Applications
 Lucas sequences are used in probabilistic Lucas pseudoprime tests, which are part of the commonly used Baillie–PSW primality test.
 Lucas sequences are used in some primality proof methods, including the Lucas–Lehmer–Riesel test, and the N+1 and hybrid N−1/N+1 methods such as those in Brillhart-Lehmer-Selfridge 1975.
 LUC is a public-key cryptosystem based on Lucas sequences that implements the analogs of ElGamal (LUCELG), Diffie–Hellman (LUCDIF), and RSA (LUCRSA). The encryption of the message in LUC is computed as a term of certain Lucas sequence, instead of using modular exponentiation as in RSA or Diffie–Hellman. However, a paper by Bleichenbacher et al. shows that many of the supposed security advantages of LUC over cryptosystems based on modular exponentiation are either not present, or not as substantial as claimed.

See also
 Lucas pseudoprime
 Frobenius pseudoprime
 Somer–Lucas pseudoprime

Notes

References

 
 
 
 
 
 
 
 
 
 
 

 Lucas sequence at Encyclopedia of Mathematics.
 
 

Recurrence relations
Integer sequences